Sidney Stanley (born 14 December 1933) is a former cricketer who played first-class cricket in South Africa from 1959 to 1964.

A leg-spin bowler, Stanley made his first-class debut for Transvaal B in 1959–60. He was immediately promoted to the Transvaal first team for the Currie Cup A Section match against Western Province, and took 5 for 112 and 5 for 60 in a victory for Transvaal. At the end of the season, he was included in trial matches for the South African tour of England but was not selected for the tour. Wisden said, "As a leg-spinner he was considered to have the most natural action this country has seen for a long time," and considered him unlucky not to be selected in the touring side.

He was less successful for Transvaal in 1960–61, and played for North Eastern Transvaal in the B Section of the Currie Cup in 1962–63 and 1963–64, with reasonable success. That was the extent of his first-class career.

References

External links

1933 births
Living people
South African cricketers
Gauteng cricketers
Northerns cricketers
Cricketers from Pretoria